Issam Alnajjar (born May 12, 2003) is a Jordanian singer, songwriter, guitarist and actor.

Life and career

Early life 
Issam Alnajjar is originally from Jaffa, Israel. He was born in Jordan and grew up there. His family has been living in Jordan for more than eighteen years. Issam’s father grew up in Kuwait and his mom grew up in Lebanon.

2020–2021: TikTok breakthrough, Universal Arabic Music and Baree? 
Issam Alnajjar first begin his musical career by posting videos on his Instagram page and YouTube channel of him singing cover songs of popular music. On 29 June 2020, Alnajjar released a single on Spotify titled "On Of A Kind." 

On 27 September 2020, Alnajjar released "Hadal Ahbek." Popular influencers David Dobrik, Addison Rae, and Caroline Carr all used Alnajjar's audio which further boost popularity to the original song. The hashtag #hadal_ahbek came up with more than 300 million results. 

On 6 April 2021, Alnajjar became the first artist to be signed to Universal Arabic Music, a division of Universal Music Group. With the signing of the label, Alnajjar was chosen by The Weekend's manager Wassim Slaiby. On 9 April, Alnajjar teamed up with Spotify to release the first Arabic song in the "RADAR" series with the release of "Turning Me Up." This single was an English remix and was produced by Loud Luxury and featured vocals from Ali Gatie. As part of promotion for the single, Alnajjar was featured on the Times Square billboard in New York City.

On 9 July, Alnajjarr released "Mn Gheirik Enti." On 17 September, Alnajjar released "Hada Ghareeb" featuring  Elyanna. On 27 September 2021, Alnajjar released a Spanish remix of "Hadal Ahbek" titled "Si Tú Vuelas," which featured Spanish vocals from Danna Paola and was produced by Alox.

2022–present: Hadal Ahbek Tour and new releases 
On 19 April 2022, Alnajjar announced the Hadal Ahbek world tour. Alnajjar was set to preform in Amman, London, Washington, D.C., Paris, Toronto, and more. On 3 May, Alnajjar appeared as the opening act at the Maroon 5 tour in Dubai.

Discography

Studio albums

Singles

As lead artist

As featured artist

Other charted songs

Music videos

Awards and nominations

References

Living people
2003 births
Jordanian male singers
Jordanian male actors
Jordanian male film actors
Jordanian male television actors
Jordanian people of Palestinian descent